The Sts. Peter and Paul Cathedral  also called Gliwice Cathedral is the name given to a Catholic church that serves as the cathedral of Gliwice, in the central district of this city of Poland.

The church was built between 1896 and 1900 and was initially a subsidiary of the parish church of All Saints. In 1908 the parish of St. Peter and Paul was erected, and its first parish priest was Monsignor Józef Jagło.

Its bells were confiscated in 1917 during the First World War. Between 1934-1936 it was renovated and repaired. In January 1945 he suffered by the Soviet bombardment of German positions during World War II, damages would be repaired soon after (1945-1946). Local authorities renewed the structure for the last time in 2009.

In 1992, Pope John Paul II erected the Diocese of Gliwice, and the parish church of St. Peter and Paul was elevated to the dignity of the cathedral.

See also
Roman Catholicism in Poland
Sts. Peter and Paul Cathedral

References

Roman Catholic cathedrals in Poland
Buildings and structures in Gliwice
Roman Catholic churches completed in 1900
20th-century Roman Catholic church buildings in Poland